Datuk Ab Aziz bin Kaprawi (born 24 July 1959) is a Malaysian politician. He was the Johor State Legislative Assembly member for the constituency of Parit Raja from 2004 to 2013 and Member of Parliament for Sri Gading in Johor from 2013 until 2018. He was the Deputy Minister of Transport in the Malaysian cabinet. He is a member of United Malay National Organisation (UMNO), a major component party in the Barisan Nasional (BN) coalition.

Political career

Johor Executive Councillor
During his tenure as an executive councillor in the Johor state executive council, Ab Aziz Kaprawi was also one of the panellists for the joint venture project for the 3,642.17ha land agriculture project with JCorp, a state owned corporate institution.

Deputy Minister
Ab Aziz Kaprawi said that his appointment as the Deputy Minister of Transport was a pleasant surprise as he did not expect to be appointed in any Federal position. However, he did vow to give his best to the people of Malaysia. He was one of the new faces that Prime Minister Najib Razak had personally selected to be in his cabinet. He also said that one of his most challenging task is to address the Automated Enforcement System (AES) issue and public transportation

Controversy
In August 2015, Aziz Kaprawi asserted that the 2.6 billion donation from anonymous sources to Malaysian Prime Minister Najib Razak's personal accounts between March 2013 and February 2015 were part of an effort to fight a global Jewish conspiracy against Malaysia, accusing the leading opposition party Democratic Action Party of being 'based on and funded by the Jews'.

Aziz Kaprawi made an announcement on 4 Apr 2015 that the vehicle entry permit (VEP) for vehicles entering Malaysia from Singapore will start on 1 Aug, after being delayed from June, before being further delayed to 1 September, and then to 1 October.

Election results

Honours
  :
  Member of the Order of the Defender of the Realm (AMN) (2005)
  Commander of the Order of Meritorious Service (PJN) - Datuk (2010)

See also
 Sri Gading (federal constituency)

References

1959 births
Living people
Malaysian people of Malay descent
Malaysian Muslims
Commanders of the Order of Meritorious Service
Members of the Order of the Defender of the Realm
People from Johor
United Malays National Organisation politicians
Members of the Dewan Rakyat
Members of the Johor State Legislative Assembly
Johor state executive councillors
21st-century Malaysian politicians